Abul qasim Bakhtiar (1872-1971) was an Iranian physician, who is known as a founder of  faculty of Tehran University of Medical Sciences. was born in Borujen, Chaharmahal Bakhtiari. He Lost his mother at birth.
Abul qasim began living with his father and when he was 6 years old, he lost his father.
He worked in Almost everything that was common at the time and beside it he continued his education.
Between 1250 and 1285 he lived in Borujen.
He was looking to make the most of solar in 1289 came to Tehran.
At the age of thirty-nine years with the consent of the doctor Jordan (because of their age gap with other students, mostly from families of ministers and state dignitaries had) a high school student Tehran Americans (Alborz) was.

In 1297, after graduating from Alborz with doctor Jordan assistance he went to the United States.
During 12 years in America with his efforts in gaining knowledge in the universities of Columbia, Iowa and South Dakota he finished his education.
He received his medical doctorate from the University of New York in fifty-five years old.
In 1310, doctor bakhtiar at the invitation of the national characters of science for the development of the country returned to Iran.
In 1313, he was participated at the Tehran University of Medical Sciences establishment.
Doctor Bakhtiar worked as vice Faculty of Medicine of Tehran University.
He was the founder of the dissection hall of Tehran University said his name has been recorded.

References 

People from Chaharmahal and Bakhtiari Province
Academic staff of Tehran University of Medical Sciences
1872 births
1971 deaths